Hoseynabad (also Romanized as Ḩoseynābād; also known as Ḩoseynābād-e Vardasht) is a village in Vardasht Rural District, in the Central District of Semirom County, Isfahan Province, Iran. At the 2006 census, its population was 435, in 95 families.

References 

Populated places in Semirom County